Cristina Lestander (born 27 June 1962 as Cristina Wirz) is a former Swiss curler.

She competed at the 1988 Winter Olympics when curling was a demonstration sport.

She works for Swiss Curling Association.

Awards
Frances Brodie Award: 1989.

Teams

Women's

Mixed

Mixed doubles

References

External links
 
 
 Profil – Once an Olympian – always an Olympian | swiss olympians 
 30 Jahre nach dem WM-Titel greifen die Aarauer Golden Girls wieder an – Regionalsport (AZ) – Sport – Aargauer Zeitung 
 «Ladies, the ice is yours!» | BZ Berner Zeitung 

Living people
1962 births
Swiss female curlers
World curling champions
Swiss curling champions
Curlers at the 1988 Winter Olympics
Olympic curlers of Switzerland
20th-century Swiss women
21st-century Swiss women